TEDxYouth@Doha is an independently organized TED conference which is localized to the youth in Qatar. The event is held annually in the month of November to commemorate United Nations Universal Children's Day. Youngsters across the nation aging from 15 - 18 are recruited as speakers in the event. TEDxYouth events are independently organized by schools and colleges across Doha and are run and hosted by the youth.

TEDx are independent events similar to TED in presentation. They can be organized by anyone who obtains a free license from TED, and agrees to follow certain principles. TEDx events are required to be non-profit, but organizers may use an admission fee or commercial sponsorship to cover costs. Speakers are not paid and must also relinquish the copyrights to their materials, which TED may edit and distribute under a Creative Commons license.

References

International conferences in Qatar
Events in Doha
Youth@Doha